Madera Acres (Madera, Spanish for "wood") is a census-designated place (CDP) in Madera County, California, United States. It is part of the Madera Metropolitan Statistical Area. The population was 9,162 at the 2020 census, virtually unchanged from 2010.

Geography
It is bordered to the south by the city of Madera, the county seat.

Demographics

2010

The 2010 United States Census reported that Madera Acres had a population of 9,163. The racial makeup of Madera Acres was 5,838 (63.7%) White, 241 (2.6%) African American, 161 (1.8%) Native American, 114 (1.2%) Asian, 5 (0.1%) Pacific Islander, 2,448 (26.7%) from other races, and 356 (3.9%) from two or more races. Hispanic or Latino of any race were 5,985 persons (65.3%).

The Census reported that 9,154 people (99.9% of the population) lived in households, 9 (0.1%) lived in non-institutionalized group quarters, and 0 (0%) were institutionalized.

There were 2,411 households, out of which 1,246 (51.7%) had children under the age of 18 living in them, 1,668 (69.2%) were opposite-sex married couples living together, 273 (11.3%) had a female householder with no husband present, 192 (8.0%) had a male householder with no wife present.  There were 136 (5.6%) unmarried opposite-sex partnerships, and 14 (0.6%) same-sex married couples or partnerships. 204 households (8.5%) were made up of individuals, and 82 (3.4%) had someone living alone who was 65 years of age or older. The average household size was 3.80.  There were 2,133 families (88.5% of all households); the average family size was 3.95.

The population was spread out, with 2,906 people (31.7%) under the age of 18, 934 people (10.2%) aged 18 to 24, 2,265 people (24.7%) aged 25 to 44, 2,279 people (24.9%) aged 45 to 64, and 779 people (8.5%) who were 65 years of age or older.  The median age was 31.0 years. For every 100 females, there were 101.1 males.  For every 100 females age 18 and over, there were 101.4 males.

The homeowner vacancy rate was 1.9%; the rental vacancy rate was 5.5%.  7,149 people (78.0% of the population) lived in owner-occupied housing units and 2,005 people (21.9%) lived in rental housing units.

2000
As of the census of 2000, there were 7,741 people, 2,122 households, and 1,894 families residing in the CDP. The racial makeup of the CDP was 60.16% White, 3.57% African American, 2.17% Native American, 1.55% Asian, 0.05% Pacific Islander, 27.44% from other races, and 5.06% from two or more races. Hispanic or Latino of any race were 50.88% of the population.

There were 2,122 households, out of which 50.6% had children under the age of 18 living with them, 73.5% were married couples living together, 10.1% had a female householder with no husband present, and 10.7% were non-families. 7.8% of all households were made up of individuals, and 2.7% had someone living alone who was 65 years of age or older.  The average household size was 3.62 and the average family size was 3.76.

In the CDP, the population was spread out, with 34.7% under the age of 18, 9.7% from 18 to 24, 27.3% from 25 to 44, 21.9% from 45 to 64, and 6.4% who were 65 years of age or older.  The median age was 30 years. For every 100 females, there were 105.0 males.  For every 100 females age 18 and over, there were 102.7 males.

The median income for a household in the CDP was $45,438, and the median income for a family was $45,633. Males had a median income of $34,731 versus $22,734 for females. The per capita income for the CDP was $15,003.  About 7.4% of families and 10.4% of the population were below the poverty line, including 12.0% of those under age 18 and none of those age 65 or over.

Government

References

Census-designated places in Madera County, California
Census-designated places in California